Aimé Martin (1781-1844) was a French writer. Born in Lyon, he moved to Paris, where he became the pupil and friend of Bernardin de St. Pierre: he collected his works and married his widow. Martin's letters to Sophia on Natural History were highly popular.

References

1781 births
1844 deaths
French male writers